Kinchant Dam is a dam in the locality of Kinchant Dam in the Mackay Region, Queensland, Australia. It created the reservoir Lake Kinchant.

Geography 
The dam is built on Sandy Creek to provide irrigation and town water. However most of the water in the lake does not come from Sandy Creek but is pumped from the Pioneer River at Mirani Weir into an  channel into the lake.

History 
The dam was built in stages starting in 1974 and completed in 1986. The dam is named after local pioneer Frank Kinchant.

Fishing
A Stocked Impoundment Permit is required to fish in the dam.

See also

List of dams and reservoirs in Australia

References

Reservoirs in Queensland
North Queensland
Dams completed in 1977
Dams in Queensland